
Bengt Arne Runnerström (born 1944 in Helsingborg) is a Swedish illustrator.

Runnerström has illustrated SVT's production of Charlie and the Chocolate Factory, and the 1985 and 1987 Sveriges Television's Christmas calendars.

Bibliography 

 Cubeo Amazonas (1983)
 Arhuaco Sierra Nevada (1984)
 Maria från Nasaret ("Maria from Nazareth", 1987)
 Shipibo (1994)
 Följ med till Mount Everest ("Come Along to Mount Everest", 2007)

Awards and recognitions 
 The Elsa Beskow Award 1985 (for Arhuaco Sierra Nevada)

References

External links 
 Illustratörscentrum's presentation of Bengt Arne Runnerström 

Swedish illustrators
1944 births
Living people